Rodi is a Swiss village in the municipality of Prato (Leventina), Canton of Ticino. Along with the contiguous village of Fiesso, it forms a tiny urban area named Rodi-Fiesso. In Italian, its name means "Rhodes".

Geography

Rodi is located in the Leventina Valley, upon the southwestern shore of Ticino river and below the Lepontine Alps. It is 2 km from Prato, 6 from Faido, 50 from Bellinzona and 75 from Lugano.

On the mountain above, in south, is located Lake Tremorgio, at 1,851 amsl. In the eastern neighbourhoods of the village it is the Dazio Grande, a former custom house built in 1561.

Transport
Rodi counts a train station (Rodi-Fiesso) on the Gotthard railway, linking Milan to Zürich. An aerial cable car links the village to Lake Tremorgio.

Rodi is crossed in the middle by the National Road 2 and is not too far from the A2 motorway Chiasso-Basel. Nearest A2 exit is in Quinto, 3.5 km far from it.

References

External links

Rodi on Google Maps
 Dazio Grande website

Villages in Ticino